The 2021 Hi-Tec Oils Bathurst 6 Hour was an endurance race for Group 3E Series Production Cars. The event, which was staged at the Mount Panorama Circuit, near Bathurst, in New South Wales, Australia, on 4 April 2021, was the fifth running of the Bathurst 6 Hour. The race was won by Shane Smollen, Rob Rubis and Shane van Gisbergen, driving a BMW M4.

Class structure 
Cars competed in the following classes:
 Class A1: Extreme Performance (Forced Induction)
 Class A2: Extreme Performance (Naturally Aspirated)
 Class B1: High Performance (Forced Induction)
 Class B2: High Performance (Naturally Aspirated)
 Class C: Performance
 Class D: Production
 Class E: Compact
 Class X: Ultimate Performance

Results 

 Class winners are shown in bold text.
 Race time of winning car: 6:02:25.5600
 Pole position: 2:25.4399, Shane van Gisbergen
 Fastest race lap: 2:26.4878, Shane van Gisbergen on lap 105.

References

External links
 2021 Hi-Tec Oils Bathurst 6 Hour Supplementary Regulations, bathurst6hour.com.au, as archived at web.archive.org
 2021 Hi-Tec Oils Bathurst 6 Hour Entry List, bathurst6hour.com.au, as archived at web.archive.org
 2021 Hi-Tec Oils Bathurst 6 Hour Spotter Guide, bathurst6hour.com.au, as archived at web.archive.org
 2021 Results, bathurst6hour.com.au, as archived at web.archive.org
 Hi-Tec Oils Bathurst 6 Hour Class Results, racing.natsoft.com.au, as archived at web.archive.org

Hi-Tec Oils Bathurst 6 Hour
April 2021 sports events in Australia
Motorsport in Bathurst, New South Wales